Lesneven is a commune in the Finistère department of Brittany in northwestern France.

History
Lesneven has its origins in the immigration from southwest Britain in the fifth and sixth centuries, and the name (Les-an-Even) means "court of Even" in Common Brittonic (Llys-Ifan in Welsh) after an alleged military leader of that period. Lesneven was the castle-town controlling Léon during the Middle Ages. The castle is now gone, but many buildings of the 15th-18th centuries are still to be found in the centre. The Museum of Léon is here.  The town now functions as a market and service centre for the surrounding rural district.

Population
Inhabitants of Lesneven are known in French as Lesneviens.

Breton language
The municipality launched a linguistic plan concerning the Breton language through Ya d'ar brezhoneg 18 July 2007.

In 2008, 19.08 percent of primary-school children attended bilingual schools.

International relations

Lesneven is twinned with:
 Kežmarok, Slovakia (friendship pact)
 Carmarthen, Wales
 As Pontes de García Rodríguez, Spain.

See also
Kernouës
Communes of the Finistère department

References

External links

 Official website 

Communes of Finistère